John Ayre (birth unknown) is a former professional rugby league footballer who played in the 1940s. He played at club level for the Featherstone Rovers (Heritage № 268).

Club career
John Ayre made his début for Featherstone Rovers on Saturday 29 March 1947.

References

External links
Search for "Ayre" at rugbyleagueproject.org

English rugby league players
Featherstone Rovers players
Place of birth missing
Year of birth missing